"Diamond" Jim Purcell (1909 – 1968) was an officer, chief detective, and then the Chief of Police in Portland, Oregon from January 1, 1953 to December 31, 1956.

Purcell was an associate of Portland mob boss Jim Elkins, and he helped protect Portland's pinball racket and other organized crime activity in the city. In this regard, Purcell was not unique among public servants in Portland, many of whom did business with Elkins.

Purcell, later chief detective and police chief, was clearly linked with mobster Jim Elkins and described later as "He was very good at derailing investigations and covering up murders. Jim Elkins... paid Purcell well for his services."

The character of Diamond Joe Quimby, mayor of the fictional town of Springfield on the television show The Simpsons, created by Portland native Matt Groening, is loosely based on Purcell.

References

 MacColl, E. Kimbark, The Growth of a City: Power and Politics in Portland, Oregon 1915 to 1950. Portland Georgian Press, 1979. 
 Lansing, Jewell Beck, Portland: people, politics and power, 1851-2001, Oregon State University Press, 2003, 
 Stanford, Phil, Portland Confidential

1909 births
Chiefs of the Portland Police Bureau
Place of birth missing
Labor relations in Oregon
1968 deaths